The Canadian Ambassador to Saudi Arabia in Riyadh is the official representative of the Government of Canada in Ottawa to the Government of Saudi Arabia. He is also concurrently accredited to the government in Muscat (Oman).

List of representatives

References 

 
Saudi Arabia
Canada